The Returned is an American supernatural drama television series developed by Carlton Cuse as an adaptation of the 2012 French series Les Revenants, which was broadcast internationally as The Returned.
The American adapted series follows residents in a small town whose lives are disrupted when people who have been dead for many years begin reappearing. Cuse wrote the pilot episode and executive produced the series alongside Raelle Tucker. The series premiered on March 9, 2015 and was cancelled by A&E after one season, on June 15, 2015.

Cast

Main
Kevin Alejandro as Sheriff Tommy Solano
Agnes Bruckner as Deputy Nikki Banks
India Ennenga as Camille Winship
Sandrine Holt as Dr. Julie Han
Sophie Lowe as Lena Winship
Mark Pellegrino as Jack Winship
Jeremy Sisto as Peter Lattimore
Mat Vairo as Simon Moran
Mary Elizabeth Winstead as Rowan Blackshaw
Tandi Wright as Claire Winship

Recurring

Aaron Douglas as Tony Darrow 
Terry Chen as Deputy Mark Bao
Dylan Kingwell as Victor
Dakota Guppy as Chloe Blackshaw
Keenan Tracey as Ben Lowry
Carl Lumbly as Pastor Leon Wright
Leah Gibson as Lucy McCabe
Chelah Horsdal as Kris
Michelle Forbes as Helen Goddard
Rhys Ward as Adam Darrow
Alexander Calvert as Hunter
Giacomo Baessato as Deputy Shane Slater
 Renn Hawkey as Paul Koretsky
 Roger Cross as Matt

Episodes

Development 
In May 2013, it was revealed that an English-language adaptation of the 2012 series was being developed by Paul Abbott and FremantleMedia, with the working title They Came Back. In September 2013, it was revealed that Abbott was no longer involved with the project, which A&E would develop. In April 2014, A&E ordered 10 episodes for the first season. On March 5, 2015, it was announced Netflix had acquired global rights to the show and would air it internationally each week, via its streaming service, following A&E's airing.

Production
The show, set in the fictional Cascades Mountains town of Caldwell, in Caldwell County, Washington, is actually filmed in and around Squamish, British Columbia.

Critical reception
The Returned has received mostly positive responses from critics. Rotten Tomatoes gives it a 67% approval rating, with a rating average of 7.4/10, based on reviews from 33 critics. The site's consensus states: "Though overshadowed by its superior source material, the US version of The Returned retains enough of the creep factor and character drama to appease fans of the genre." Metacritic scored it 67 out of 100, based on 24 "generally favorable" reviews.

See also 
 Resurrection, a 2014–15 American series with a similar premise.

Glitch, an Australian TV series that premiered on 9 July 2015 on ABC. The series strikes follows similar story lines to The Returned in that it is set in the fictional country town of Yoorana, Victoria, and follows seven people who return from the dead in perfect health but with no memory. No one in the town knows why the deceased have returned. The first series was awarded Best Television Drama Series at the 2016 AACTA Awards. The series also won Most Outstanding Drama Series at the 2016 Logie Awards.

References

External links 
 
 The Returned on Netflix
 

2015 American television series debuts
2015 American television series endings
A&E (TV network) original programming
2010s American drama television series
American fantasy television series
2010s American horror television series
2010s American mystery television series
2010s American supernatural television series
American television series based on French television series
English-language television shows
Serial drama television series
Television series by Fremantle (company)
Television series created by Carlton Cuse
Television shows filmed in British Columbia
American fantasy drama television series